Expointer is an agricultural show with national importance in Brazil that occurs every year in the Parque de Exposições Assis Brasil in the city of Esteio, in the metropolitan area of Porto Alegre in the Brazilian state of Rio Grande do Sul. It is considered the largest livestock show in Latin America. The first edition occurred on February 24, 1901, in Porto Alegre. In 2004 the fair received a record public of 720 thousand people.

External links
Expointer - Official website

Agricultural shows
Agriculture in Brazil